De Nios översättarpris is a translation prize given by the Swedish literary society Samfundet De Nio. It was awarded for the first time 1970.

Winners
 1970: Hans Björkegren and Irma Nordvang
 1977: Bengt Jangfeldt
 1978: Carl-Henrik Wittrock
 1980: Géza Thinsz, János Csatlós and Pierre Zekeli
 1982: Tord Bæckström, Ulrika Wallenström, Lars Erik Blomqvist and Caj Lundgren
 1985: Eva Alexanderson
 1986: Mårten Edlund
 1987: Annika Ernstson, Arne Lundgren and Johan Malm
 1988: Martin von Zweigbergk, Barbara Lönnqvist and Bertil Cavallin
 1989: Marion Wajngot, Marianne Eyre, Eva Liljegren, Irmgard Pingel and Bengt Samuelson
 1994: Anders Bodegård, Lasse Söderberg, Jan Stolpe and Ingvar Björkeson
 1995: Ingrid Ingemark and Ulla Roseen
 1996: Astrid Lundgren, Sture Pyk, Bertil Albrektson and Hans-Jacob Nilsson
 1997: Thomas Warburton and Gun-Britt Sundström
 1998: Jens Nordenhök
 1999: Margaretha Holmqvist, Inger Johansson and Dan Shafran
 2000: Staffan Holmgren
 2001: Marianne Sandels and Tetz Rooke
 2002: Hesham Bahari, Peter Handberg and Rose-Marie Nielsen
 2005: Ervin Rosenberg, Camilla Frostell and Maria Ekman
 2007: Carmen Cima, Maria Ortman and Martin Tegen
 2009: Meta Ottosson, Erik Ågren, Karin Löfdahl, Hans Blomqvist, Jan Stolpe, Staffan Skott and Kerstin Gustafsson
 2010: Hans Björkegren and Ulrika Wallenström
 2011: Ulrika Wallenström and Lena E. Heyman
 2012: Erik Andersson
 2014: Aimée Delblanc
 2018: Lena Fries-Gedin and John-Henri Holmberg
 2019: Inger Johansson and Jan Henrik Swahn

Sources 
 Samfundet De Nios homepage.
 Samfundet De Nios översättarpris

Translation awards
Awards established in 1970
Swedish literary awards